Jeremy Alcoba Ferrer (born 15 November 2001) is a Spanish motorcycle racer.

Career statistics

FIM CEV Moto3 Junior World Championship

Races by year
(key) (Races in bold indicate pole position, races in italics indicate fastest lap)

Grand Prix motorcycle racing

By season

By class

Races by year
(key) (Races in bold indicate pole position, races in italics indicate fastest lap)

References

External links

2001 births
Living people
Spanish motorcycle racers
Motorcycle racers from Catalonia
Moto3 World Championship riders
People from Tortosa
Sportspeople from the Province of Tarragona
Moto2 World Championship riders